The Mormon Prophet and His Harem; or, an Authentic History of Brigham Young, His Numerous Wives and Children. is a biography of Brigham Young by C. V. Waite, first published in 1866.

Impact
Mark Twain's Roughing It references Waite's The Mormon Prophet in relation to the book's account of the Mountain Meadows massacre and the accusation that Brigham Young ordered it.

Editions
 
 

American biographies
Books critical of Mormonism
History books about the Latter Day Saint movement
Mountain Meadows Massacre
Cultural depictions of Brigham Young
1866 books
1866 in Christianity
Works about polygamy in Mormonism
Books about presidents of the church (LDS Church)

References